Catherine Anne Merridale, FBA (born 12 October 1959) is a British writer and historian with a special interest in Russian history.

Early life and education
Merridale was born on 12 October 1959 to Philip and Anne Merridale. She was educated at Andover Grammar School, a state school in Andover, Hampshire, and at Cricklade College, a further education college that is also in Andover. She studied history at King's College, Cambridge, graduating with a first class Bachelor of Arts (BA) degree in 1982. She continued her studies at the Centre for Russian and East European Studies of the University of Birmingham, and completed her Doctor of Philosophy (PhD) degree in 1987. Her doctoral thesis was titled "The Communist Party in Moscow 1925-1932".

Academic career
Merridale was Professor of Contemporary History at Queen Mary, University of London from 2004 to 2014. She has been a senior research fellow at the Institute of Historical Research, University of London, since her retirement from full-time academia in 2014.

Research interests
In an interview with The Independent, Merridale recalls how she became interested in Russia and its past. She began studying Russian in school and first visited the country at the age of 18. She said of her first impression of Russia, "Going from the then ghastly Soviet airport, everything in Moscow was grey and cold and hard. Suddenly in the middle of the city were these golden cupolas and enormous redbrick walls with peculiar swallowtail battlement pattern that didn’t look Russian, but did at the same time." When she began work on her higher degrees, Merridale spent a year living in Moscow and observing the changes occurring during that time. In another interview with Waterstones.com, Merridale summarises her perspective of Russian history, "my message is that we have to take each generation of Russian leaders as they are and not keep assuming that Russia is fated to follow a special path and will always be the same. That there is a Russian destiny."

Later career
Having retired from her academic career, Merridale became a freelance writer in 2014. She has written for the London Review of Books, the New Statesman, The Independent, The Guardian, and the Literary Review. She has also contributed to BBC Radio. The author has spoken out publicly about the issues of publishing books in the field of history. There is much more pressure to publish shorter articles than full-length books, a "great shame" according to Merridale, author of multiple history books.

Selected works

Honours
 UK Heinemann Award for Literature for Night of Stone
 New York Military Affairs Symposium's Arthur Goodzeit Prize for best book on Military History for Ivan's War
 Pushkin House Book Prize for Red Fortress
 Wolfson History Prize for Red Fortress
 She was elected a Fellow of the British Academy, the United Kingdom's national academy for the humanities and the social sciences, in 2016.

References

External links 
Author's Website
Merridale discusses Red Fortress for the London School of Economics and Political Science and recorded on 9 October 2013 in the Hong Kong Theatre of Clement House
 New York Times review of Ivan's War from April 2006

1959 births
Living people
Historians of Russia
British military historians
British women historians
Alumni of the University of Birmingham
Alumni of King's College London
Fellows of the British Academy
People from Andover, Hampshire
British anti-communists